Miasteczko Studenckie AGH is the student campus of AGH University of Science and Technology and an osiedle in Kraków. It lies mostly between Reymonta, Tokarskiego, Nawojki and Miechowska streets.

There are 8500 accommodations, for students of AGH (5400 places), and also students of Jagiellonian University, Pedagogical University of Cracow, Cracow University of Economics, Agricultural University of Cracow and other.

Rooms are occupied with 2-3 persons each.

In summer, it becomes the biggest hotel center in Poland, offering 4000 accommodations.

Due to extraterritoriality of university, it's the only place in Kraków where drinking of alcohol on open air is allowed.

Dorms

 Dom Studencki nr 1 "OLIMP" ul. Rostafińskiego 9
 Dom Studencki nr 2 "BABILON" ul. Rostafińskiego 11
 Dom Studencki nr 3 "AKROPOL" ul. Tokarskiego 1
 Dom Studencki nr 4 "FILUTEK" ul. Rostafińskiego 10
 Dom Studencki nr 5 "STRUMYK" ul. Rostafińskiego 8
 Dom Studencki nr 6 "BRATEK" ul. Rostafińskiego 6
 Dom Studencki nr 7 "ZAŚCIANEK" ul. Rostafińskiego 4
 Dom Studencki nr 8 "STOKROTKA" ul. Rostafińskiego 2
 Dom Studencki nr 9 "OMEGA" ul. Budryka 9
 Dom Studencki nr 10 "HAJDUCZEK" ul. Budryka 7
 Dom Studencki nr 11 "BONUS" ul. Budryka 5
 Dom Studencki nr 12 "PROMYK" ul. Budryka 3
 Dom Studencki nr 13 "STRASZNY DWÓR" ul. Budryka 1
 Dom Studencki nr 14 "KAPITOL" ul. Budryka 2
 Dom Studencki nr 15 "MARATON" ul. Tokarskiego 10
 Dom Studencki nr 16 "ITAKA" ul. Tokarskiego 8
 Dom Studencki nr 17 "ARKADIA" ul. Tokarskiego 6
 Dom Studencki nr 18 ul. Tokarskiego 4
 Dom Studencki nr 19 ul. Tokarskiego 2
 I Dom Studencki "ALFA"  ul. Reymonta 17

Traditions
"Janosik" - making noise with cookware and other hardware and playing melody from Janosik television series.
Every year there are snowball battles between dorms.
Grilling is very common on the grass between dorms.

Campuses
Buildings and structures in Kraków